Erhard 'Big Bimbo' Weller (1926–1986) was a German actor known for his height of 7'9.75".

Weller was born in Zwickau, Germany in 1926 as Paul Siegfried Erhard Weller and died in Erlangen, Germany.

He appeared in two movies, Bottoms Up (1974) and Milo Barus, der stärkste Mann der Welt and two television series, Monaco Franze and Am laufenden Band.

In January 1963 he married Christa Neuber.

References

External links

1926 births
People from Zwickau
People with gigantism
German male television actors
German male film actors
1986 deaths